Apex Community Park is a public, urban park in Apex, North Carolina. Located on the eastern end of Apex, Apex Community Park is bordered by Laura Duncan Road on the West and Lake Pine Drive on the East.

The 160 acre park contains numerous soccer fields, a baseball complex with batting cages, as well as volleyball, tennis and basketball courts. One basketball court is fenced for roller hockey. 

100-person and 50-person picnic shelters are available at the back of the park before the lake trail head.  In addition, playgrounds, and hiking trails are also centered around the 50 acre lake. The lake is open to fishing, kayaking, and other non-motor watercraft.

References

Apex, North Carolina
Urban public parks
Parks in Wake County, North Carolina
Tourist attractions in Apex, North Carolina